English Mountain is a mountain located in the western foothills of the Great Smoky Mountains region of East Tennessee. Rising to a peak of 3,629 feet, it is known for offering scenic fall colors within a convenient drive from Knoxville.

A few rugged mountain roads provide access to the summit. Alpine Drive provides the main access, providing service to several small communities along with several resort cabins in the area available for tourists.  It continues across the gap to the Wilhite area, forming the only complete pass over the mountain to the Jones Cove and Camp Hollow areas at the southeastern foot of the mountain.

The English Mountain Fire Lookout Tower is a historic landmark, according to the National Park Service, with a single access via Carson Springs Road.

Forbidden Caverns is a cave attraction on the northwestern face of the mountain.

Source of water
The mountain is a significant source of drinking water for nearby communities. The English Mountain Spring releases more than 2 million gallons of water each day, and is the source for several premium bottled water distributors. Since 1997, it has been the source for the English Mountain Spring Water Company of Dandridge, Tennessee, (a supplier of Cracker Barrel restaurants as well to the Visitor Centers within Great Smoky Mountains National Park).

April 2016 wildfire
In spring 2016, a wildfire consumed several hundred acres of forest on the mountain.

See also
Chilhowee Mountain, also on the western edges of the Great Smoky Mountains
Foothills Parkway, a scenic byway in the region
2016 Great Smoky Mountains wildfires

References

External links
English Mountain Spring Water Company
BlingH2o, English Mountain Spring water distributor
An informal history of English Mountain, by Dr. John Rehder

Great Smoky Mountains
Mountains of Cocke County, Tennessee
Landforms of Jefferson County, Tennessee
Mountains of Tennessee